Euphemia of Ross may refer to:
 Euphemia I, Countess of Ross (died 1394-98)
 Euphemia II, Countess of Ross, daughter of Alexander Leslie, Earl of Ross and his wife Isabella Stewart
Euphemia de Ross (died 1386), Queen Consort of Scotland

See also
Euphemia (disambiguation)